Pete Sampras was the defending champion, but lost in the semifinals this year.

Mark Woodforde won the title, beating Ivan Lendl 5–4 in the final, when Lendl retired from the match.

Seeds

Draw

Finals

Top half

Bottom half

References

External links
 Main Draw

U.S. Pro Indoor
1993 ATP Tour